Glasgow Shettleston may mean or refer to:

 Glasgow Shettleston (UK Parliament constituency)
 Glasgow Shettleston (Scottish Parliament constituency)